Microcottus is a small genus of marine ray-finned fishes belonging to the family Cottidae, the typical sculpins. These fishes are found in the northern Pacific Ocean.

Taxonomy
Microcottus was first proposed as a genus in 1940 by the Soviet zoologist Peter Schmidt with Acanthocottus sellaris as its type species by monotypy. A. sellaris has originally been described by Charles Henry Gilbert from Bristol Bay in Alaska. The 5th edition of Fishes of the World classifies this genus in the subfamily Cottinae of the family Cottidae but other authorities classify it in the subfamily Myoxocephalinae of the family Psychrolutidae, although others place the subfamily Myoxocephalinae within the Cottidae.

Etymology
Microcottus prefixes Cottus, the type genus of the family Cottidae, with micro, meaning "small", alluding to the small size of M. sellaris in comparison to the related genus Myoxocephalus.

Species
Microcottus is a small genus which contains 2 species:
 Microcottus matuaensis Yabe & Pietsch, 2003
 Microcottus sellaris (C. H. Gilbert, 1896) (Brightbelly sculpin)

Characteristics
Microcottus sculpins are characterised by their pelvic fins having a wide connection to the belly by an inner membrane. They have prevomerine teeth but none on the palatine, The pores on the lateral line have two openings, On the preoperculum the top spine is recurved and the pelvic fins have a single spine and three soft rays.

Distribution and habitat
Microcottus sculpins are found in the North Pacific. M. sellaris is distributed from off the Sea of Okhotsk coast of Hokkaido to the northern Sea of Japan into the Bering Sea. M. matuensis has so far proved to be endemic to the Kuril Islands. These fishes are found in the intertidal and subtidal zones and may be found in rivers as the larvae and fry are swept into them by the tide.

References

Cottinae
Marine fish genera